The 205 Al-Badr Corps is one of the eight corps of the Islamic Emirate Army established in October 2021 and headquartered in Kandahar. The current Chief of Staff is Hizbullah Afghan. In the mid of November 2021, 300 soldiers after completing military training graduated from the 2nd Brigade of the Al-Badr Corps in Zabul province.

The Islamic Republic of Afghanistan-era corps it replaced was known as the 205th 'Atul' Corps and was a part of Afghan National Army.

Commands

Brigades

References

Military units and formations established in 2021
Corps of the Islamic Emirate Army